Peripheral plasma membrane protein CASK is a protein that in humans is encoded by the CASK gene. This gene is also known by several other names: CMG 2 (CAMGUK protein 2), calcium/calmodulin-dependent serine protein kinase 3 and membrane-associated guanylate kinase 2. CASK gene mutations are the cause of XL-ID with our without nystagmus and MICPCH, an X-linked neurological disorder.

Gene 
This gene is located on the short arm of the X chromosome (Xp11.4). It is 404,253 bases in length and lies on the Crick (minus) strand. The encoded protein has 926 amino acids with a predicted molecular weight of 105,123 Daltons.

Function 
This protein is a multidomain scaffolding protein with a role in synaptic transmembrane protein anchoring and ion channel trafficking. It interacts with the transcription factor TBR1 and binds to several cell-surface proteins including neurexins and syndecans.

Clinical importance 
This gene has been implicated in X-linked mental retardation, including specifically mental retardation and microcephaly with pontine and cerebellar hypoplasia. The role of CASK in disease is primarily associated with a loss of function (under expression) of the CASK gene as a result of a deletion, missense or splice mutation. It appears that mutations in the gene lead to diminished amounts of the protein being coded.  As a result, CASK is unable to form complexes with other proteins leading to a cascade of events.  Research has shown there is significant down-regulation of the genes involved in pre-synaptic development and of CASK protein interactors.

Males affected by CASK variants tend to have more severe symptoms than females due to the X-linked nature of the disease. These genetic issues are often fatal in the womb for male embryos or else lead to infant mortality. Females with CASK mutations have variable phenotypes with moderate to severe intellectual disability. CASK missense mutations and some splice mutations can lead to the milder neurodevelopmental phenotype.

CASK related disorders are mainly found in girls. The prevalence is unknown but generally thought to be below 400 cases worldwide. Patients are often born healthy but within the first few months of life show progressive microcephaly. Although there can be prenatal decelaration of head circumference growth, the majority of cases will not be diagnosed according to current recommendations for fetal CNS routine assessment.

The exact mode of pathology is not clear, but evidence from mice models indicates CASK deficiency in neurones causes the following effects:

 reduced levels of associated proteins such as Mint1 and neurexin
 Higher levels of Neuroligin 1
 Increased glutamate release at synapses and reduced GABA release affecting the E/I balance in maturing neural circuits
 Down-regulation of GluN2B resulting in disruption of synaptic E/I balance

Even slight changes in CASK expression in humans leads to dysregulation of the formation of presynapses, especially in inhibitory neurones.

Interactions 

CASK has been shown to interact with:
 KCNJ4
 APBA1
 ATP2B4
 CINAP and TBR1
 DLG1
 DLG4
 F11 receptor
 ID1
 KCNJ12
 LIN7A
 Nephrin
 Parkin (ligase)
 RPH3A
 SDC2

External links 

 CASK Research Foundation - A non-profit based in the UK for research, information and support into CASK related disorders including MICPCH
 Angelina CASK Neurological Research Foundation - A non-profit based in Australia creating research grants for research into CASK gene related disorders.

References

Further reading

External links 
 

EC 2.7.11